Kostermanthus malayanus is a species of plant in the family Chrysobalanaceae. It is endemic to Peninsular Malaysia. It is threatened by habitat loss.

References

Chrysobalanaceae
Endemic flora of Peninsular Malaysia
Endangered plants
Taxonomy articles created by Polbot
Taxobox binomials not recognized by IUCN